North or Northern Indic may refer to anything from the northern parts of the Indian subcontinent, such as:

 Northern Indo-Aryan languages, also known as the Northern Indic languages
 Northern Brahmic script, also known as the Northern Indic script

See also 
 Indic languages (disambiguation)
 Northern India
 North Indian Ocean